

Regulations
There are two levels of legal and regulatory oversight: the legal requirements for clients who are fiduciaries or trustees for an account, and the regulations applicable to an advisor's practice. It is important to understand the requirements for each.

ERISA
An investment policy is required under virtually all investor circumstances, with the exception of individual investors. According to the US Employee Retirement Income Security Act of 1974, as amended (ERISA), for every qualified company retirement plan (e.g., 401[k], profit sharing, pension, 403[b]) there are certain fiduciary responsibilities for managing the plan assets with the care, skill, prudence and diligence of a prudent expert and by diversifying the investments of the plan so as to minimize the risk of large losses. The IPS documents these fiduciary responsibilities and ensures fiduciaries are adhering to these responsibilities.

When auditing an ERISA plan, the U.S. Department of Labor regularly asks to review the associated IPS. This is due to ERISA regulations requiring that employee benefit plans are managed to ensure that investment firms meet their financial responsibility to the employees covered by such plans. Under ERISA, all qualified plan trustees have a special responsibility to “prudently” manage their plan assets for the sole benefit of the plan participants. ERISA and the Department of Labor have established the following prudent procedures for plan trustees:
 An investment policy must be established 
 Plan assets must be diversified 
 Investment decisions must be made with the skill and care of a prudent expert 
 Prohibited transactions must be avoided 

A properly written IPS should help ensure compliance with these required procedures. The IPS sets forth the objectives, restrictions, funding requirements and general investment structure for the management of the plan's assets, and provides the basis for evaluating the plan's investment results. By establishing the criteria and procedures for selecting investments and investment managers, an IPS can minimize “Monday morning quarterbacking” if investment performance is disappointing.

An IPS also can help trustees communicate a plan's investment guidelines and procedures to those assisting in the investment process, such as investment advisors or money managers. Finally, and most importantly, an IPS provides a guide for making future investment decisions. Having and using the policy statement compels the trustees to be more disciplined and systematic, which in itself should improve the odds of meeting the investment goals.

UPIA and other legislation
The US Uniform Prudent Investor Act (UPIA) is state-adopted legislation that governs the investment conduct of private family trusts. First enacted in 1994, it serves as the hallmark of subsequent legislation (as well as how the courts now interpret such requirements relating to ERISA). UPIA requires a written investment policy for every trust in which trustees manage assets for the benefit of others. UPIA formally requires a focus on the total portfolio, rather than following its earlier regulatory guidance that individual investments should be evaluated independently of whether or not they were appropriate for portfolio inclusion. The total portfolio is now the fiduciary's central consideration when judging the trade off between risk and return. There are no more restrictions on the types of investments that can be included in the portfolio; the trustee can invest in anything that helps achieve the risk/return objectives of the trust and that meets the other requirements of prudent investing.

UPIA specifies that diversification is part of the definition of prudent investing. It also makes clear that if appropriate investment processes are in place and followed, the trustees will not be held responsible for the results. Under UPIA, the delegation of investment and management functions is permitted and encouraged. Establishing and maintaining an IPS facilitates such delegation.

Government and institutional funds
The following two acts are substantially similar to UPIA; both require a written IPS.
 The 1997 Uniform Management Public Employee Retirement Systems Act. Addresses trustee responsibilities of government-sponsored qualified employee benefit plans
 The 2006 Uniform Prudent Management of Institutional Funds Act. Addresses the responsibilities of trustees of nonprofit monies (primarily foundations and endowments)

Consumer protection
Financial Industry Regulatory Authority (FINRA) member firms and Registered Investment Advisors (RIAs) are subject to two primary obligations in terms of consumer protection: “suitability” and “fair dealing.” RIA firms must satisfy additional fiduciary standards of care and client protection. Well thought-out procedures are critical to satisfying these requirements. An IPS can help satisfy regulatory auditors by documenting the appropriate implementation of these procedures.

FINRA member firms are subject to a “suitability” requirement; this is described in the Financial Industry Regulatory Authority (FINRA) Rule 2310. When a broker recommends that a client buy or sell a particular security, that broker must have a reasonable basis for believing that the recommendation is suitable for that client. In making this assessment, the broker must consider the client's risk tolerance, other security holdings, financial situation (income and net worth), financial needs and investment objectives, among other things. Registered Investment Advisors are subject to fiduciary standards for suitable recommendations.

In addition to the suitability requirement, brokers are subject to a “fair dealing” requirement which is also described in FINRA 2310. According to this rule, sales efforts will be judged on the basis of whether they can be reasonably said to represent fair treatment for the persons to whom the sales efforts are directed. An “obligation of fair dealing” means that brokers must have reasonable basis for believing that their securities recommendations are suitable for and appropriate to certain customers in light of the customers’ financial needs, objectives and circumstances.

A well-crafted IPS will include all the relevant information needed for the broker to establish that both the suitability and fair dealing requirements have been satisfied.

Additional requirements for Registered Investment Advisory firms
RIA firms must be registered as providing investment management services with either the U.S. Securities and Exchange Commission (SEC) or with the equivalent state office.  RIAs have an even higher standard of care established by fiduciary standard to carry out their responsibilities with “good faith, honesty, integrity, loyalty and undivided service of the beneficiary’s interest.” The good faith clause requires RIAs to act reasonably in order to avoid negligent handling of the beneficiary's interests, and not to favor anyone else's interest, including the fiduciary's, over that of the client.

Whether or not fiduciary responsibilities have been satisfied is not determined by investment performance, but by whether prudent investment practices and standards were followed. To establish those practices and standards, the preparation of the IPS is one of the most important functions of the RIA. To emphasize its importance, in some SEC districts, SEC auditors are asking to see the IPS for a sampling of client relationships.

IPS and the investment process
The investment process can be seen as occurring in six steps, as described below. Many experts believe that the creation of the IPS is the single most important step in this process. All the other steps either lead into the IPS, or are directed by the IPS.

 Initial discovery: The initial discussions and sharing of documents that allows both the client and the advisor to learn about one another.  On the one hand, this might include learning about the client's circumstances, goals, income needs, restrictions, current holdings, risk tolerance, etc. The client should also attempt to learn as much as possible about the investment manager's investment philosophy, practices, and procedures.
 Discussion and agreement: All the issues related to what is to happen between client and advisor should be placed on the table. Where there are questions or a lack of clarity exists, further discussion may be needed. Eventually, the client and advisors need to come to agreement on issues such as the degree of client involvement, the asset allocation to be used, the kinds of instruments to be utilized (or not), how tax considerations will be treated, investment goals, needs for liquidity or income, investment restrictions, investment methodology, and responsibilities of each party to the other.
 Creating the IPS: Once the agreements have been reached on the full list of issues and policies to be followed, they need to be recorded. This document will become the IPS. The client(s) and the advisor sign the document, signifying each party's acknowledgment of the agreements.
 Investment implementation: Until there is an agreement between the advisor and client about the policies to be followed, no investment trades can responsibly happen. Once the IPS has been signed by all parties, the initial and ongoing trades can be implemented according to the road map provided by the IPS.
 Ongoing communication: Meetings, reports, and other communications will occur between advisor and client, generally as suggested in the IPS.
 Monitoring and adjustment: Rarely does a portfolio stay as originally structured. The IPS should describe how the portfolio will be monitored for poor performers, how good performers will be identified, how (and if) rebalancing and tax loss harvesting opportunities will be implemented, and it should address any other ways in which the investment manager will try to ensure that the portfolio will stay in line with the objectives set forth in the IPS.

Clients and their needs change over time. It is therefore important that the advisor periodically returns to the first step "discovery" to make sure the client's then-current needs and wishes are being addressed. Every year or two, the IPS should be reviewed by the client and the advisor to ensure continued agreement with its provisions.

Required components
Nothing should be included in the IPS to which the advisor or client cannot commit and be sure will be implemented.

An IPS usually has five major components that should be unique to each client.

1. All key factual data about the client, including where the client's assets are held, the amount of their assets under the management of portfolio manager, and the identification of the trustees or interested parties to the account. This can be as detailed or as simple as desired.

2. A discussion and review of the client's investment objectives, investment time horizon, anticipated withdrawals or deposits, need for reserves or liquidity, and attitudes regarding tolerance for risk and volatility.

3. Any constraints and restrictions on the assets, such as liquidity and marketability requirements, diversification concentrations, the advisor's investments strategy (including tax management), locations of assets by account type (taxable versus tax-deferred), how client accounts that are not being managed (if any) will be handled, and any transaction prohibitions.

4. The security types and asset classes to be included in or excluded from the portfolio, and the basic allocation among asset categories and the variance (rebalancing) limits for this allocation.

5. The monitoring and control procedures and responsibilities of each party.

The IPS and the advisor–client relationship
The IPS development process lays the foundation for a successful relationship between advisors and clients. An important benefit of utilizing and IPS in clarifying needs, procedures and expectations is that clients have a better understanding of what the advisor is going to do with their money, and of their advisor's approach. Clients have an opportunity to understand the reasons why each action is to be taken. As a result, clients tend to have more confidence in the advisor's abilities.

Having that increased level of understanding and confidence becomes important when markets go through a down period. The IPS establishes investment guidelines and a framework for long-term investment thinking and can help calm nerves when things are particularly volatile.

Sources
 Prudent Investment Practices: A Handbook for Investment Fiduciaries, published by the Foundation for Fiduciary Studies
 “Investment Policy: Winning the Losers Game,” Charles Ellis, Irwin Publishing
 “The Management of Investment Decisions,” Trone, Albright & Taylor, McGraw-Hill

Notes

Investment